John Aden Gillett  is a British actor. He is best known for playing the role of Jack Maddox on the BBC series The House of Eliott.

Biography and career

Gillet was born in the city of Aden, Yemen, from which he got his name. He attended Elizabeth College, Guernsey.

Aden trained at the Royal Academy of Dramatic Arts. He has received a number of awards and honours for his work, including the Tree Prize, the Sir Emile Littler Prize, the Vanbrugh Prize and the Radio Prize. He received the Theatre World Award for Best Newcomer on Broadway for his performance in "An Inspector Calls" at the Royale Theatre, Broadway.

He played Mr Banks in a new production of Mary Poppins and Benedick in Much Ado About Nothing. In films, he appeared in The Winslow Boy and The Borrowers.

He is active in the Theatre Royal at Bath with the Peter Hall Company in numerous productions of Shakespearean plays and other classics, including Antony and Cleopatra, As You Like It, and at The Old Vic in The Tempest. He also appeared in Noël Coward's Blithe Spirit, and Private Lives, and in George Bernard Shaw's Man and Superman and ‘’The Doctors’ Dilemma’’.

On television, he appeared as Robin Hood in Ivanhoe and as Peter Townsend, Princess Margaret's forbidden love, in The Queen's Sister.  He also appeared in Harry Enfield's Television Programme and as Charles Garner in episode 8 series 2 of Lovejoy first broadcast on 24 February 1991.

He narrated the 2004 Discovery Channel documentary Who Betrayed Anne Frank. The documentary discusses the suspect who exposed the location of the Frank Family to the gestapo's in accordance from evidence found by author Carol Ann Lee.

From December 2018 to January 2019 he played the role of Scrooge in the RSC's production of A Christmas Carol at Stratford-upon-Avon.

He was married to actress Sara Stewart. They have two children.

Filmography

References

External links

Living people
20th-century British male actors
21st-century British male actors
Alumni of RADA
British male film actors
British male stage actors
British male television actors
People from Aden
Year of birth missing (living people)